Farsley Celtic Football Club is a football club based in Farsley, West Yorkshire, England. The club was founded in 1908, but folded in 2010 and were reformed as Farsley AFC before returning to the name Farsley Celtic in 2015.

History
The club was established in 1908 as Farsley Football Club and played in amateur leagues in Leeds. They joined the West Riding County Amateur League in 1926 and were runners-up in 1936–37. In 1949 they joined Division Two of the Yorkshire League. They won the Division in 1951–52, earning promotion to Division One. After three bottom-half finishes, league performances improved and Farsley finished fifth in 1955–56 and fourth in 1956–57, before ending the season as runners-up in both 1957–58 and 1958–59. The 1959–60 season saw them win the league for the first time, and throughout the 1960s the club finished in the top seven of the league. They were champions again in 1968–69 and runners-up in 1970–71 and 1971–72. In 1974–75 the club reached the first round of the FA Cup for the first time, losing 2–0 at home to Third Division Tranmere Rovers in a match moved to Elland Road to accommodate the record 11,000 crowd. After finishing in the bottom four of Division One the following season, the club were relegated to Division Two. The following season saw them finish fourth in Division Two, earning promotion back to Division One. However, their stay in Division One only lasted one season as they were relegated again at the end of the 1977–78 season. After three years in Division Two they were promoted back to Division One at the end of the 1980–81 season.

In 1982 the Yorkshire League merged with the Midland League to form the Northern Counties East League, with Farsley placed in Division One North. They remained in the division until winning it in 1984–85, after which they were promoted to the Premier Division. In 1986–87 they were Premier Division runners-up, earning promotion to the newly formed Division One of the Northern Premier League. The club remained in the division for seventeen seasons until a third-place finish in 2003–04 saw them promoted to the Premier Division. Their first season in the Premier Division ended in controversy; Spennymoor United failed to fulfil their fixtures as they folded and the league opted to expunge their results, leaving Farsley ending the season as league champions. However, the Football Association over-ruled the league, awarding three points to all clubs who had not played Spennymoor at the time they had stopped playing. This meant that both Hyde United and Workington moved above Farsley in the table, with Hyde gaining automatic promotion. Farsley attempted to overturn the decision in the High Court, but were unsuccessful and subsequently entered the play-offs. After beating Whitby Town 1–0 in the semi-finals, they lost to Workington on penalties in the final.

In 2005–06 Farsley finished fourth in the Premier Division, again qualifying for the play-offs. After beating Marine 1–0 in the semi-finals, they defeated North Ferriby United 2–1 in the final to earn promotion to the Conference North. A second successive promotion was achieved the following season when a fifth-place finish in the Conference North saw them again qualify for the playoffs. They went on to beat Kettering Town 4–2 on aggregate in the semi-finals, before beating Hinckley United 4–3 in the final at the Pirelli Stadium. They also reached the first round of the FA Cup again, eventually losing 2–0 in a replay to Milton Keynes Dons after the home match had ended 0–0. The club's first season in the Conference National ended in relegation back to the Conference North. Financial problems led to the club being expelled from the league prior to the 2009–10 season, although they were readmitted shortly afterwards. However, they subsequently went into administration and were expelled from the Conference in March 2010 after being unable to fulfil their fixtures, before being disbanded on 10 March.

The club was reformed as Farsley A.F.C. and joined the Premier Division of the Northern Counties East League for the 2010–11 season. They went on to win the division, earning promotion to Division One North of the Northern Premier League. A fourth-place finish in 2011–12 saw them qualify for the play-offs, losing 3–0 to Witton Albion in the semi-finals. In 2015 the club returned to the name Farsley Celtic. They finished second in 2016–17, again qualifying for the play-offs. After beating Colne 4–0 in the semi-finals, the club defeated Ossett Town 4–2 in the final to earn promotion to the Premier Division. The following season saw the club finish fifth in the Premier Division, reaching the play-offs. However, they were beaten 2–1 in the semi-finals by Ashton United. In 2018–19 the club were Premier Division champions, earning promotion to the National League North.

In 2019 the club changed their playing colours from blue to green and white, adopted a new badge and renamed their ground following a takeover by Paul Barthorpe.

Ground

The club moved to Throstle Nest in 1948. Following the club’s collapse into administration in 2009, Leeds City Council purchased the ground from the administrators and sold it to the owners of the new club, Farsley A.F.C., while retaining the adjoining sports hall and land proposed for new football pitches. The ground was renamed The Citadel in 2019.

Staff
Manager: Russ Wilcox
Assistant Manager: Steve Thornber
Player/First Team Coach: Dave Syers
Goalkeeping Coach: Tom Morgan
Physiotherapist: Gareth Liversedge
Kit Manager: Nick Gill
Women's Manager: Jamie Sykes

Boardroom
Chairman: Paul Barthorpe
Directors: Joshua Greaves, Robert Winterbottom
Chief Executive: Joshua Greaves
Director of Football Operations: Pav Singh
Project Development Director: Daniel Bennett
Head of Football Administration: Caroline Harriman
Board Directors: Paul Glover & John Stubbs

Honours
Northern Premier League
Premier Division champions 2018–19
Yorkshire League
Division One champions 1959–60, 1968–69
Division Two champions 1952–53
Northern Counties East League
Premier Division champions 2010–11
Division One North champions, 1984–85
League Cup winners 2010–11
West Riding County Cup
Winners 1957–58, 1959–60, 1966–67, 1970–71, 1983–84, 1987–88, 1994–95, 1996–97, 2000–01, 2005–06, 2016–17, 2017–18

Records
Best FA Cup performance: First round, 1974–75, 2006–07
Best FA Trophy performance: Quarter-finals, 2022–23
Best FA Vase performance: Quarter-finals, 1987–88
Record attendance: 11,000 vs Tranmere Rovers, FA Cup first round, 1974–75 (at Elland Road)

See also
Farsley Celtic F.C. players
Farsley Celtic F.C. managers

References

External links

Official website

 
Football clubs in England
Football clubs in West Yorkshire
Association football clubs established in 1908
1908 establishments in England
Sport in Leeds
Phoenix clubs (association football)
West Riding County Amateur Football League
Yorkshire Football League
Northern Counties East Football League
Northern Premier League clubs
National League (English football) clubs
Companies that have entered administration in the United Kingdom